Degrassi (season 1) may refer to:
Degrassi Junior High (season 1) airing 1987
Degrassi High (season 1) airing 1989-1990
Degrassi: The Next Generation (season 1), airing 2001–2002, renamed Degrassi in 2010
 Degrassi: Next Class (season 1), airing 2016